Dane Zander (born in Australia) is an Australian rugby union player who plays for the Queensland Reds in Super Rugby. His playing position is prop. He was announced in the Reds squad for round 1 in 2020.

Reference list

External links
Rugby.com.au profile
itsrugby.co.uk profile

Australian rugby union players
Rugby union players from Queensland
Living people
Rugby union props
Year of birth missing (living people)
Brisbane City (rugby union) players
Queensland Reds players